Edward Hagan may refer to:

 Edward James Hagan (1879–1956), Scottish minister and biblical scholar
 Edward P. Hagan (1846–1893), American politician from New York